Baron Ardenerie was a title in the Peerage of Ireland which was created in May 1580 for John Bourke, who died on 24 November of that year, and became dormant in 1591 on the death of the second Baron.

Barons Ardenerie (1580)
John Bourke, 1st Baron Ardenerie (died 1580)
William Bourke, 2nd Baron Ardenerie (1560–1591)

See also
House of Burgh, an Anglo-Norman and Hiberno-Norman dynasty founded in 1193

References

Dormant baronies in the Peerage of Ireland
Noble titles created in 1580